Gillian MacLaren Jacobs (born October 19, 1982) is an American actress and director. She is best known for portraying Britta Perry on the NBC sitcom Community (2009–2015), Mimi-Rose Howard on the fourth season of the HBO comedy-drama series Girls (2015), Mickey Dobbs on the Netflix romantic comedy series Love (2016–2018), and the voice of Atom Eve on the Amazon animated series Invincible (2021–present). She has also appeared in films such as Gardens of the Night (2008), Life Partners (2014), Don't Think Twice (2016), Ibiza (2018), I Used to Go Here (2020), and The Fear Street Trilogy (2021).

Early life
Gillian MacLaren Jacobs was born in Pittsburgh on October 19, 1982, the daughter of Carnegie Mellon University alumni relations department employee Martina Magenau and investment banker William F. Jacobs Jr. Her parents divorced when she was two years old, and she was raised by her mother in Mt. Lebanon, Pennsylvania. Her family owned the Erie Brewing Company (not to be confused with the later brewery of the same name), where her grandfather was president and CEO until it closed in 1978. She began studying acting at the age of four and attended weekend acting classes at the Pittsburgh Playhouse while growing up. She performed with the Pittsburgh Public Theater, where she was a perennial contender in the Public's Shakespeare Monologue Contest, leading her to be cast as Titania in its production of A Midsummer Night's Dream. After graduating from Mt. Lebanon High School in 2000, she moved to New York City to attend the Juilliard School, where she graduated with a BFA in 2004.

Career

Jacobs' first acting role was Adele Congreve on the television series The Book of Daniel. Although she played Kim in the pilot of Traveler, the role was given to Pascale Hutton when ABC acquired the series; the series was canceled after eight episodes. Jacobs subsequently made guest appearances on Fringe and Law & Order: Criminal Intent. In 2006, she starred in an Off-Off-Broadway production of Christopher Denham's cagelove. While overall critical reaction to the play was negative, Jacobs earned praise in several reviews. The New York Times advised readers to "remember the name of Gillian Jacobs, a stunning Juilliard graduate who has the glow of a star in the making".

Jacobs has appeared in theatrical productions such as The Fabulous Life of a Size Zero (2007), A Feminine Ending (2007), and The Little Flower of East Orange (2008). In March 2009, she joined the cast of the NBC single-camera comedy series Community as Britta Perry, a high school dropout who aspires to become a psychologist. Her film work includes Blackbird (2007), Choke (2008), Gardens of the Night (2008), The Box (2009), Revenge for Jolly! (2012), Bad Milo! (2013), Walk of Shame (2014), The Lookalike (2014), Life Partners (2014), Hot Tub Time Machine 2 (2015), Visions (2015), Don't Think Twice (2016), and Brother Nature (2016). She voiced Sta'abi in the Nickelodeon series Monsters vs. Aliens, and Atom Eve in the Amazon Prime animated series Invincible. Community was canceled by NBC on May 9, 2014, and later that month, it was reported that Jacobs had landed a recurring role as Mimi-Rose Howard in the fourth season of the HBO series Girls.

In June 2014, Yahoo! Screen picked up Community for a sixth season. It was announced on September 16, 2014, that Jacobs was cast to star as Mickey in the Netflix original comedy series Love, which ran from February 2016 to March 2018.

Jacobs directed the 2015 documentary short The Queen of Code about computer scientist and United States Navy rear admiral Grace Hopper. In 2017, Jacobs co-starred in Janicza Bravo's first full length feature, Lemon, which debuted at Sundance Film Festival.  In 2018, she directed Curated, a narrative film short, as a part of a series produced by TNT and Refinery29.

In 2020, Jacobs starred in the comedy-drama film I Used to Go Here, directed by Kris Rey. In 2020, she directed "Higher, Further, Faster," an episode of Marvel's 616, a documentary series about the impact of Marvel Comics on culture.

In February 2021, she and co-host Diona Reasonover premiered a STEM-focused podcast, Periodic Talks, on Stitcher Radio. In July 2021, she had a supporting role in the Netflix horror films The Fear Street Trilogy as Christine "Ziggy" Berman.

Personal life
Jacobs does not drink alcohol or take any recreational drugs, a choice she made when she was younger after watching some family members struggle with addiction. She revealed that her father was an addict and that she was fearful of becoming the same, a feeling reinforced in her youth by reading the book Go Ask Alice, which follows a teenage girl who becomes addicted to drugs.

Filmography

Film

Television

Web

Stage

Audio

Awards and nominations

References

External links

 
 

1982 births
21st-century American actresses
Actresses from Pittsburgh
American film actresses
American stage actresses
American television actresses
American voice actresses
Juilliard School alumni
Living people
People from Mt. Lebanon, Pennsylvania
American people of French descent